Jason Alexander Brickman (born November 19, 1991) is a Filipino-American basketball player for the Kaohsiung Aquas of the T1 League. He completed his college career for the Long Island University Blackbirds after the 2013–14 season. Brickman was considered one of the best passers in the nation according to ESPN analyst Jay Bilas. Of Brickman, Bilas said "He really understands angles very well. He gets the ball to (LIU's) best players, and he does a really nice job of managing the game. An excellent passer." Brickman led NCAA Division I in assists per game as a junior with an 8.52 average, then repeated in 2013–14 with a 10.00 per game average. He is one of only four players in Division I history to record 1,000 assists.

High school career
Brickman played prep basketball at Tom C. Clark High School in San Antonio, Texas. In his senior season he led Clark to a District 28-5A championship behind the strength of a 29–7 record. He was named the district's most valuable player, earned first team all-district honors and also earned Class 5A All-State honors from the Texas Association of Basketball Coaches.

College career

Freshman season
In the fall of 2010 Brickman began his collegiate career for Long Island. As a freshman in 2010–11 he averaged 5.5 assists per game, led the Northeast Conference (NEC) in total assists (180) and in assists-per-turnover ratio (2.81). The 180 assists were the fourth-highest season assist total in school history. He also helped lead Long Island to a berth in the 2011 NCAA Tournament, and in a first round loss to North Carolina, Brickman recorded eight assists and two steals. Then-head coach Jim Ferry claimed Brickman was the "John Stockton" to their team. At the end of the season he was named the NEC Rookie of the Year by the NIT and Metropolitan Basketball Writers Association as well as being selected to the NEC All-Rookie and All-Tournament teams.

Sophomore season
The Blackbirds earned a second consecutive berth to the NCAA Tournament behind Brickman and NEC Player of the Year Julian Boyd. Brickman's 7.3 assists per game ranked fifth nationally while his 249 total assists set a new school record. He was chosen as a Second Team All-Conference performer while also repeating as an All-NEC Tournament selection; in the NEC championship, Brickman scored 18 points and dished out 11 assists against Robert Morris, thus clinching their automatic 2012 NCAA Tournament berth. Long Island lost to Michigan State in the first round.

Junior season
Brickman led NCAA Division I in assists per game with an 8.50 average. He managed this despite Long Island losing reigning NEC Player of the Year Julian Boyd to an ACL injury in December 2012 that sidelined him for the entire season.

Senior season
On February 17, 2014, Brickman was named one of the 23 finalists for the Bob Cousy Award, given annually to the best point guard in Division I men's basketball. In his final college game, played on March 1, 2014, Brickman became only the fourth men's player in Division I history to collect 1,000 career assists, finishing with 1,009. He also became only the second Division I men's player to average double figures in points and assists in the same season, after Avery Johnson of Southern in 1987–88.

Professional career
In June 2014 he signed a contract to play for Dynamo Moscow in the Russian Basketball Super League where he averaged 2 points and 2.8 assists in 8 Superleague games. On December 2, 2014 he chose to leave Dynamo.

On January 23, 2015, Brickman signed with Medi Bayreuth of the Basketball Bundesliga. On April 6, he parted ways with the German team after averaging 7.5 points and 4.8 assists in 11 games.

In 2015, the Westports Malaysia Dragons signed Brickman being a Filipino as one of their two ASEAN imports in the ASEAN Basketball League. As a member of the Dragons in 2016, he won a championship and was named Finals MVP.

In June 2016, Brickman signed with Mono Vampire Basketball Club of the GSB Thailand Basketball Super League and Thailand Basketball League.

Brickman averaged 12.8 points on a 43-percent shooting from the field, to go with 8.9 assists, 4.5 rebounds, and 1.8 steals in his 13 games last season with Mono Vampire.

The Fil-Am guard also played for Hi-Tech Bangkok City in the Thailand Super Basketball League (TBSL), where he netted 11.5 points, 8.8 assists, 3.9 rebounds, and 1.8 steals this past season.

In 2019, Brickman played for Mighty Sports in both the 2019 Dubai International Basketball Championship and in the 2019 Jones Cup.

In October 16, 2019, Brickman signed with the San Miguel Alab Pilipinas for the 2019-20 ABL season.

In September 24, 2021, Brickman signed with Kaohsiung Aquas of the T1 League. He was the league's assisting champion for the 2021–22 season. On July 2, 2022, Brickman was selected to the all-T1 League first team in 2021–22 season. On July 4, 2022, Brickman awarded the Most Valuable Import of the T1 League in 2021–22 season. On July 21, Brickman re-signed with the Kaohsiung Aquas.

See also
 List of NCAA Division I men's basketball season assists leaders
 List of NCAA Division I men's basketball career assists leaders

References

1991 births
Living people
American expatriate basketball people in Germany
American expatriate basketball people in Malaysia
American expatriate basketball people in Russia
American expatriate basketball people in Taiwan
American expatriate basketball people in Thailand
American men's basketball players
American sportspeople of Filipino descent
ASEAN Basketball League players
Basketball players from San Antonio
BC Dynamo Moscow players
Filipino expatriate sportspeople in Germany
Filipino expatriate basketball people in Malaysia
Filipino expatriate basketball people in Taiwan
Filipino expatriate basketball people in Thailand
Filipino men's basketball players
Kaohsiung Aquas players
T1 League Asian imports
T1 League imports
Kuala Lumpur Dragons players
LIU Brooklyn Blackbirds men's basketball players
Medi Bayreuth players
Point guards
Citizens of the Philippines through descent
T1 League All-Stars